This is a list of peer-reviewed academic journals covering the field of bioethics. Developed with reference to the 2015 list of Top 100 Bioethics Journals in the World, and Where to publish and not to publish in bioethics.

A
 Accountability in Research
 AMA Journal of Ethics
 American Journal of Bioethics
 American Journal of Law & Medicine

B
 Bioethics
 Biology and Philosophy
 BioSocieties
 BMC Medical Ethics

C
 Canadian Journal of Bioethics
 Cambridge Quarterly of Healthcare Ethics
 Clinical Ethics

E
 Environmental Values
 Ethical Theory and Moral Practice
 European Journal of Health Law

H
 Hastings Center Report

I
 Indian Journal of Medical Ethics
 International Journal of Feminist Approaches to Bioethics
 IRB: Ethics & Human Research

J
 Journal of Agricultural and Environmental Ethics
 Journal of Bioethical Inquiry
 Journal of Empirical Research on Human Research Ethics
 Journal of Law, Medicine & Ethics
 Journal of Medical Ethics
 Journal of Value Inquiry

K
 Kennedy Institute of Ethics Journal

L
 The Linacre Quarterly

M
 Medicine, Health Care and Philosophy

N
 Narrative Inquiry in Bioethics
 The National Catholic Bioethics Quarterly
 Neuroethics
 Notre Dame Journal of Law, Ethics & Public Policy
 Nursing Ethics

P
 Public Health Ethics
 Pediatric Ethicscope: The Journal of Pediatric Bioethics

S
 Science and Engineering Ethics Science, Technology, & Human ValuesT
 Theoretical Medicine and BioethicsY
 Yale Journal of Health Policy, Law, and Ethics''

References

Lists of academic journals
Ethics literature
Bioethics journals